Events from the year 1874 in the United States.

Incumbents

Federal Government 
 President: Ulysses S. Grant (R-Illinois)
 Vice President: Henry Wilson (R-Massachusetts)
 Chief Justice: Morrison Waite (Ohio) (starting March 4)
 Speaker of the House of Representatives: James G. Blaine (R-Maine)
 Congress: 43rd

Events
 January 1 – New York City annexes The Bronx.
 February 21 – The Oakland Daily Tribune publishes its first newspaper.
 March 18 – Hawaii signs a treaty with the United States granting exclusive trading rights.
 March – The Young Men's Hebrew Association in Manhattan (which still operates today  as the 92nd Street Y) is founded.
 May 20 – Levi Strauss and Jacob Davis receive a U.S. patent for blue jeans with copper rivets. The price is $13.50 per dozen.
 July 1 
Philadelphia Zoo opens, the first public zoo in the U.S.
Four-year-old Charley Ross, America's first major kidnapping for ransom victim, is taken from his home in Philadelphia.
The Sholes and Glidden typewriter, with cylindrical platen and QWERTY keyboard, is first marketed.
 November 4 – Democrats regain the U.S. House of Representatives for the first time since 1860.
 November 7 – Harper's Weekly publishes a political cartoon by Thomas Nast considered the first important use of an elephant as a symbol for the Republican Party.
 November 9 – The Sigma Kappa sorority is founded at Colby College in Waterville, Maine, by Mary Caffrey Low, Elizabeth Gorham Hoag, Ida Fuller, Frances Mann, and Louise Helen Coburn.
 November 11 – The Gamma Phi Beta sorority is founded at Syracuse University. This is the first women's Greek letter organization to be called a sorority.
 November 24 – Inventor Joseph Glidden patents barbed wire.
 November 25 – The United States Greenback Party is established as a "National Independent" political party, composed primarily of farmers financially hurt by the Panic of 1873.
 November 28 – King Kalākaua's 1874–75 state visit to the United States begins when the ship carrying him from Hawaii, USS Benicia, docks in San Francisco.

Undated
 The San Diego Natural History Museum is founded.
 Eastern Parkway in Brooklyn, laid out by Frederick Law Olmsted and Calvert Vaux, is completed.

Ongoing
 Reconstruction era (1865–1877)
 Gilded Age (1869–c. 1896)
 Depression of 1873–79 (1873–1879)

Births
 January 4 – John W. Thomas, U.S. Senator from Idaho from 1928 to 1933 and from 1940 to 1945 (died 1945)
 January 7 – M. M. Logan, U.S. Senator from Kentucky from 1931 to 1939 (died 1939)
 January 9 – Helen Tufts Bailie, social reformer and activist (died 1962)
 January 29 – John D. Rockefeller Jr., financier and philanthropist, son of John D. Rockefeller (died 1960)
 February 2 – William T. Innes, writer, ichthyologist, publisher (died 1969)
 March 4 – Stephen Victor Graham, United States Navy Rear Admiral and 18th Governor of American Samoa (died 1955)
 March 8 – Charles Weeghman, restaurateur and owner of Chicago Cubs (died 1938)
 April 5 – Jesse H. Jones, entrepreneur, 9th United States Secretary of Commerce (died 1956)
 April 16 – Frederick Van Nuys, U.S. Senator from Indiana from 1933 to 1944 (died 1944)
 March 5 – Daniel O. Hastings, U.S. Senator from Delaware from 1928 to 1937 (died 1966)
 March 26 – Robert Frost, poet (died 1963)
 March 29 – Lou Henry Hoover, First Lady of the United States as wife of Herbert Hoover (died 1944)
 May 20 – Augustine Lonergan, U.S. Senator from Connecticut from 1933 to 1939 (died 1947)
 July 1 – Edward P. Costigan, U.S. Senator from Colorado from 1931 to 1937 (died 1939)
 July 3 – Margaret G. Hays, comics writer and artist (died 1925)
 August 10
 Herbert Hoover, 31st President of the United States from 1929 to 1933 (died 1964)
 Tod Sloan, jockey (died 1933)
 September 13 – Henry F. Ashurst, U.S. Senator from Arizona from 1912 to 1941 (died 1962)
 December 4 – Edwin S. Broussard, U.S. Senator from Louisiana from 1921 to 1933 (died 1934)

Deaths

 January 7 – John Burton Thompson, U.S. Senator from Kentucky from 1853 to 1859 (born 1810)
 January 17 – Chang and Eng Bunker, Thai-American conjoined twin brothers (born 1811)
 February 24 – John Bachman, Lutheran minister, social activist and naturalist (born 1790)
 March 8 – Millard Fillmore, 13th President of the U.S. from 1850 to 1853, and 12th Vice President of the U.S. from 1849 to 1850 (born 1800)
 March 11 – Charles Sumner, U.S. Senator from Massachusetts from 1851 to 1874 (born 1811)
 June 8 – Cochise, one of the greatest leaders of the Apache Indians, dies on the Chiricahua reservation in southeastern Arizona
 October 6 – Samuel M. Kier, industrialist (born 1813)
 November 20 – Jackson Morton, U.S. Senator from Florida from 1849 to 1855 (born 1794)
 Full date unknown
 Paul Jennings, slave of James Madison, writer (born 1799)
 Eliza Seymour Lee, pastry chef and restaurateur (born 1800)

See also
Timeline of United States history (1860–1899)

References

External links
 

 
1870s in the United States
United States
United States
Years of the 19th century in the United States